Karim Adil Ansarifard (born 3 April 1990) is an Iranian professional footballer who plays as a forward for Omonia and the Iran national team. His playing style and ability have drawn comparisons to Ali Daei (the coach who scouted him) and he has been named Daei's "successor".

World Soccer selected Ansarifard as one of the best young talents in the world alongside Javier Hernández and Jack Wilshere. In January 2012, FIFA.com selected him as one of the players to watch in 2012. Goal.com also chose him as one of the hottest 100 young football players in the world. Also in 2012, FIFA ranked him as the 48th best goalscorer in the world and second best in Asia.

Club career

Saipa
During one of Saipa's training camps in Ardabil, Karim's home city, he was taken on a training trial by then-coach Ali Daei and was accepted into the club's youth academy and reserves. In the 2007 season Saipa the Iranian reigning champions encountered problems in scoring after the departure of Mohsen Khalili and retirement of then-coach Ali Daei. After 12 weeks Ali Daei moved Ansarifard to the first team from the reserves and the young starlet answered the coach's faith with good games including the only goal against a strong Sepahan team. Ansarifard scored 13 goals during the 2009–10 season. After strong performances, Karim became fast one of the best players of Saipa and targeted by European clubs such as Borussia Dortmund and Celtic. Later, Steaua București made a €200,000 bid for a half season loan. In May 2011, it was suggested that Everton are interested in signing Ansarifard. Despite major interest from European clubs, conscription problems made the prospect of Ansarifard moving to a foreign club unlikely. Ansarifard renewed his contract with Saipa for another two years on 14 July 2011. In the 2011–12 Iranian Pro League season, Ansarifard scored 21 goals and made 5 assists for Saipa, becoming the league's top scorer.

Persepolis
There was much speculation during the 2011–12 Iranian Pro League season that Ansarifard would be leaving Saipa. On 17 June 2012 he signed a three-years contract with Persepolis. He was given the number 9 shirt. He scored his first goal in a pre-season match against Aluminium. He made his debut for Persepolis in an official match against Sanat Naft and scored his first goal for Persepolis against Gahar Zagros. He scored his first Hat-trick as a Persepolis player (and second in his career) against Paykan. He scored another hat-trick in the Round of 32 of Hazfi Cup at Malavan. He also scored the Persepolis' first goal in the Hazfi Cup final. His team would go on to lose on penalties. At the start of the season, Ansarifard initially decided to stay at Persepolis despite bids from Sepahan, Tractor and two UAE Pro League sides. However, he fell out with club head coach Ali Daei during pre-season. He was out listed and was eventually transferred to Tractor on 14 July 2013.

Tractor
After Persepolis listed him in the out of the squad, he decided to play another season in Iran and joined Tractor. He signed a one-year contract with the option of a transfer to the European leagues in the case of bids. He made his debut on 1 August 2013 in a 1–1 draw in Tabriz derby over Gostaresh Foolad. He won Hazfi Cup title with Tractor and was named as the tournament's Most Valuable Player. Ansarifard scored seventeen goals for Tabriz's reds during his spell at the team, fourteen goals was in the league, making him the season's top scorer for the second time in his professional career. In July 2014 Ansarifard was released by Tractor and was allowed to sign with a European club.

Osasuna
On 29 August 2014, Ansarifard signed a two-year deal with Segunda División's CA Osasuna. He made his league debut on 4 October 2014, coming on as a substitute for Roberto Torres in the 61st minute against Racing de Santander. He made his first start on 18 October in a 3–2 win against CD Tenerife.

Panionios
In the summer of 2015, Ansarifard signed with Panionios in the Superleague Greece. He scored his first goal for the club in a 5–1 win over Panetolikos on 3 October 2015. He scored the winning goal on 7 November 2015 in a match against Platanias. On 28 November 2015, Ansarifard scored a brace and helped Panionios win against PAS Giannina 2–0. His solo goal in April 2016 during matchday 28 in a victory against PAOK earned him goal of the week honours.

In May 2016, Ansarifard, whose contract was due to run out at the end of next season, was offered to PAOK but the 26-year old international was not on top of Eagles' shortlist at the time. He started the 2016–17 season as the indisputable leader of club's offence. On 10 September 2016, he scored his first goal for the season in a 3–0 home win against rivals Asteras Tripolis.

Olympiacos
On 13 January 2017, Ansarifard signed a 3.5-year contract with Greek giants Olympiacos for a transfer fee of €400,000, Panionios held a 10% sell-on clause. He was assigned the number 17. On 24 January 2017, he made his first appearance for the club in a Greek Cup 1–1 away draw against Aris, scoring his first goal to equalise the game.

Ansarifard made his league debut on 11 February 2017 in a 2–0 win against AEL, coming on as a late second-half substitute. On 23 February 2017, Karim scored a brace in his second Europa League game against Osmanlıspor. With Karim's goals Olympiacos advanced to the Round of 16 for the first time since 2012. Karim won the UEFA Europa League Player of the week due to his performance against Osmanlıspor.

Ansarifard scored his first league goal for Olympiacos on 12 March 2017 in a 2–0 victory against Atromitos. On 19 August 2017, on the first match day of the Greece Super League Ansarifard scored and assisted a goal in his team's 4–1 victory. After helping the Greek giants to a league title, he was unexpectedly left off the UEFA Champions League squad by new manager Besnik Hasi, who put the forward up for sale. On 14 October 2017, he scored a brace against his old club, in an Olympiacos 4–3 away win. On 2 December 2017, he scored a brace sealing a 3–1 home win against Apollon Smyrnis.
On 9 December 2017, he bagged a goal and giving an assist to Kostas Fortounis for his second goal in the game, in a glorious 4–1 away Superleague win against Panetolikos.
On 24 December 2017, Ansarifard's exceptional performance with Olympiacos sparked what has arguably become the best year of his career. The Albanian manager was fired in late September for poor results and Ansarifard has been able to work himself back into the starting lineup, becoming the league's top scorer thus far with seven goals from 11 matches, being the 6th best Asian player in Europe for the season according to Football Tribe Asia.
On 7 January 2018, he scored in a 3–0 away win game against AEL, helping his club to achieve the 7th successive win in his rally to gain the 8th consecutive title. On 15 January 2018, he scored after an assist from Guillaume Gillet sealing a 2–0 home win game against Lamia. On 21 January 2018,
Ansarifard was on target in the 26th and 57th minutes for Óscar García’s Superleague leaders, chalked up their ninth win in a row with a straightforward 3–0 home victory over 10-man Xanthi at the Georgios Karaiskakis Stadium. He was named MVP of the game. On 28 January 2018, equalised a 1–1 away game against Asteras Tripolis with a penalty kick, when Asteras Tripolis’ former Panathinaikos defender Kostas Triantafyllopoulos brought him down in the box.

On 4 February 2018, he opened the score in a frustrating 2–1 home loss against rivals AEK Athens stayed behind in the rally for the 2017–18 title. On 31 March 2018, he scored with a cool finish from an exquisite Leonardo Koutris pass in a 1–1 away draw against Levadiakos. On 16 April 2018, opened the score in an emphatic 5–1 home win against Kerkyra. On 29 April, he scored a brace in a 4–0 home win game against Panetolikos, struggling with PAOK's forward Aleksandar Prijović for the title of top scorer. Ansarifard's contract was cancelled by Olympiacos after their 2017–18 season.

Nottingham Forest
On 3 November 2018, it was announced that Ansarifard had signed for Nottingham Forest in the Sky Bet Championship after delays obtaining a work permit. The Iranian international penned a one-and-a-half-year contract at the City Ground. He made his debut for the club coming on as a substitute in a 1–0 win over Sheffield United on 3 November. Ansarifard scored his first goal in a 3–0 win at home to Hull City, also assisting the first goal.

Al-Sailiya
On 12 July 2019, Ansarifard made the move to Al-Sailiya in the Qatar Stars League.

AEK Athens
On 25 August 2020, Ansarifard signed a three-year contract with Greek Super League club AEK Athens. On 1 October 2020, he scored the winning goal in the 90+4 minute, to achieve a 2–1 win against Wolfsburg in the 2020–21 UEFA Europa League play-off round.

On 22 November 2020, Ansarifard came in as a substitute and helped to a 4–1 home win against AEL. The following week, he scored in a 2–1 away win against Asteras Tripolis. On 13 December 2020, he scored a brace in a dramatic 4–3 away win against Apollon Smyrnis. On 11 January 2021, he scored the only goal in a 1–0 away win against Lamia.

On 8 March 2021, he scored a brace in a 2–0 home win against Apollon Smyrnis. On 11 April 2021, he scored with a penalty in a 3–1 away win against Aris Thessaloniki. On 22 July 2021, he opened the score for the club in the UEFA Europa Conference League, but AEK faced a frustrated away loss with 2–1 against FK Velež Mostar. On 24 October 2021, he opened the score in a 3–1 away win against Volos.

Omonia 
On 30 August 2022, Ansarifard joined Cypriot First Division club Omonia on a two-year contract, with the option of an additional year. On 18 September, he scored his first goal for the club in a 4–0 home win against Paralimni.

On 6 October, he opened the score in an eventual 2–3 home defeat to Manchester United in the Europa League. This made Ansarifard, Omonia's 100th player to score in a European competition.

International career

Ansarifard was Invited to the Iran U17 national team in 2005. In 2006 AFC U-17 Championship, he wore number 14 and was a benchwarmer. Ansarifard played as a substitute in two matches against Tajikistan and Yemen.

Ansarifard made his debut for the senior Iran national team in a match against Iceland in November 2009 under Afshin Ghotbi and scored his first international goal and the only goal of the game. He was given the number 10 previously worn by Ali Daei and scored on 15 January 2011 his third international goal against North Korea, so Ansarifard became Iran's youngest ever goalscorer in the AFC Asian Cup. In 2014 FIFA World Cup qualification, Ansarifard scored a double against Maldives at Azadi Stadium. He came on as a late substitute against Uzbekistan in the World Cup Qualifiers and assisted with a pass for Mohammad Reza Khalatbari as a 94th-minute winner. On 1 June 2014, he was called into Iran's 2014 FIFA World Cup squad by Carlos Queiroz. He played his first World Cup match against Bosnia and Herzegovina, coming on as a substitute for Ashkan Dejagah in the 68th minute. He was called into Iran's 2015 AFC Asian Cup squad on 30 December 2014 by Carlos Queiroz. He provided an assist to Sardar Azmoun in their Asian Cup preparation match against Iraq. In May 2018 he was named in Iran's preliminary squad for the 2018 World Cup in Russia. He scored a penalty against Portugal with a 1–1 as the result.

Style of play
He has been compared to Iranian legend Ali Daei and German forward Thomas Müller by his fans. His favourite player is Fernando Torres. He is a centre forward with great energy and impressive in both air and ground. He played as a right winger in first season for Saipa but in next seasons returned to his main position.

Personal life
Ansarifard is the last child of an Iranian Azerbaijani family and has three brothers and three sisters. He studied physical education at Islamic Azad University Central Tehran Branch.

In August 2018, Ansarifard married Greek businesswoman Alexandra Sofia Kalouli at a ceremony held in Vouliagmeni. Kalouli is the managing director of the Innovative Maritime Emotional Intelligence Center (IMEQ Center), a mental health research center with offices in Cyprus and Greece.

Career statistics

Club

International

Scores and results list Iran's goal tally first, score column indicates score after each Ansarifard goal.

Honours
Tractor
Hazfi Cup: 2013–14

Olympiacos
Super League Greece: 2016–17

Individual
Persian Gulf Pro League Top goalscorer: 2011–12 (21 goals), 2013–14 (14 goals)
Persian Gulf Pro League Striker of the Year: 2011–12 , 2013–14
Persian Gulf Pro League Team of the Season: 2011–12 , 2013–14
Super League Greece Team of the Year: 2017–18

See also
Iranians in Spain

References

External links

Karim Ansarifard at PersianLeague.com
Karim Ansarifard at TeamMelli.com
Karim Ansarifard's Profile in 18ghadam.ir

1990 births
Living people
People from Ardabil
Iranian footballers
Islamic Azad University, Central Tehran Branch alumni
Association football forwards
Saipa F.C. players
Persepolis F.C. players
Tractor S.C. players
CA Osasuna players
Panionios F.C. players
Olympiacos F.C. players
Nottingham Forest F.C. players
Al-Sailiya SC players
AEK Athens F.C. players
Persian Gulf Pro League players
Segunda División players
Super League Greece players
English Football League players
Qatar Stars League players
Iran international footballers
2011 AFC Asian Cup players
2015 AFC Asian Cup players
2014 FIFA World Cup players
Iranian expatriate footballers
Iranian expatriate sportspeople in Spain
Iranian expatriate sportspeople in Greece
Iranian expatriate sportspeople in England
Iranian expatriate sportspeople in Qatar
Expatriate footballers in Spain
Expatriate footballers in Greece
Expatriate footballers in England
Expatriate footballers in Qatar
Footballers at the 2010 Asian Games
2018 FIFA World Cup players
2019 AFC Asian Cup players
Asian Games competitors for Iran
AC Omonia players
Iranian expatriate sportspeople in Cyprus
2022 FIFA World Cup players